Mathematics education in Australia varies significantly between states, especially at the upper secondary level.

Secondary

New South Wales

Higher School Certificate
The Higher School Certificate (HSC) in NSW contains a number of mathematics courses catering for a range of abilities. There are four courses offered by the NSW Education Standards Authority (NESA) for HSC Study:

Mathematics Standard 1 or 2: A basic mathematics course containing precalculus concepts; the course is heavily based on practical mathematics used in everyday life. While the more advanced courses include statistical topics, this is the only course which introduces normal distributions, standard deviations and z-scores. These topics are alluded to in more advanced courses though not formally considered. 
Mathematics Advanced: An advanced level calculus-based course with detailed study in probability and statistics, trigonometry, curve sketching, and applications of calculus. It is the highest level non-extension mathematics course. The calculus is only a single variable in all of year 12 mathematics in NSW. Computational methods such as the trapezoidal rule are encountered for evaluating integrals. The course includes a brief foray into series and sequences, including an application to basic finance through the modelling of compound interest. The nature of lines, circles and parabolas as loci are investigated however these properties are not exploited by the plane geometry coursework. Quadratic equations are studied and students learn techniques to reduce special quintic and exponential equations to quadratics. 
Mathematics Extension 1 (Must be studied concurrently with Mathematics Advanced): A more advanced course building on concepts in calculus, trigonometry, polynomials, basic combinatorics, vectors, and further statistics. Students learn the binomial theorem to extend their knowledge of probability, along with using circle geometry to prove a greater family of statements. The trigonometry component includes double-angle identities and factoring the addition of a sine and cosine function into a single sinusoid. In calculus, students are exposed to a greater variety of integration techniques such as substitution. Parametrization of planar curves is introduced, mainly focusing on lines, circles and parabolas. The plotting of cubic equations and solution of specific cases through polynomial long division and the remainder theorem enable a deeper understanding of polynomials.  
Mathematics Extension 2 (Must be studied concurrently with Mathematics Advanced and Mathematics Extension 1): A highly advanced mathematics course containing an introduction to complex numbers, advanced calculus, motion, and further work with vectors. While NSW Mathematics curricula does not include matrix theory nor group theory, the geometric properties of complex numbers alludes to both of these. The former is hinted at in the multiplicative properties of complex numbers, as students are required to plot the products, sums and quotients of complex numbers on the Argand plane. While group theory is not explicitly mentioned, roots of unity and cyclic groups are extensively studied. With their newfound familiarity with complex numbers, the fundamental theorem of algebra can now be formally stated. Students are now able to exploit this closure to solve even more polynomial equations. Recursive integral sequences, integration by parts and partial fraction decomposition techniques allow the solution to a wider class of problems. Projectile motion is studied in the kinematics module, which surpasses the depth of study found in HSC physics. This course synergizes with HSC Physics, as students are able to apply this knowledge in their Physics exams to arrive at more elegant and efficient solutions. The parametrisation of lines, circles and parabolas in Mathematics Extension 1 is further developed to the entire family of conics, including degenerate cases. Students are exposed to rectangular hyperbolas, however hyperbolic trigonometric functions are not included. Despite this students are expected to adapt to novel material, such as proving properties of the catenary via its expression in exponential functions.

The defining feature of content progression from Mathematics Advanced through to Extension 2 Mathematics is the level of mathematical maturity expected of students. In higher courses, students have exposure to a greater breadth and depth of techniques, and are expected to synthesize knowledge from seemingly disparate topics. In Mathematics Advanced exams students may be asked to apply familiar techniques to unfamiliar contexts, such as being given an identity through which they must solve a problem. Further mathematical maturity is vital to success in Extension 2 exams, as assessment focuses on both conceptual understanding and computational abilities. 

The difficulty in HSC final exam questions generally increases throughout the course of the paper. In one Extension 2 HSC examination, the final question provides students with a series of prompts and smaller questions, which culminate in a proof of the Basel Problem.

Victoria

Victorian Certificate of Education

The Victorian Certificate of Education (VCE) mathematics subjects are designed to cater for the varying abilities and aptitudes of Victorian students.
There are four courses offered for VCE study:

Foundation Mathematics: Provide for the continuing mathematical development of students with respect to problems encountered in practical contexts in everyday life at home, in the community, at work and in study.
General Mathematics: Provide for the study of non-calculus and discrete mathematics topics. They are designed to be widely accessible and provide preparation for general employment, business or further study, in particular where data analysis, recursion and financial modelling, networks and matrices are important.
Mathematical Methods: Provide for the study of simple elementary functions, transformations and combinations of these functions, algebra, calculus, probability and statistics, and their applications in a variety of practical and theoretical contexts. They also provide background for further study in, for example, science, technology, engineering and mathematics (STEM), humanities, economics and medicine.
Specialist Mathematics: Provide for the study of various mathematical structures, reasoning and proof. The areas of study in Units 3 and 4 extend content from Mathematical Methods Units 3 and 4 to include rational and other quotient functions as well as other advanced mathematics topics such as logic and proof, complex numbers, vectors, differential equations, kinematics, and statistical inference. They also provide background for advanced studies in mathematics and other STEM fields. Study of Specialist Mathematics Units 3 and 4 assumes concurrent study or previous completion of Mathematical Methods.

Queensland
In 2019 Queensland implemented a new QCE (Queensland Certificate of Education) system which included new syllabi for each of the senior mathematics subjects.  Current senior mathematics general subjects are: General Mathematics, Mathematical Methods, Specialist Mathematics (listed in order of increasing complexity).  There is also an applied subject called Essential Mathematics and a short course called Numeracy. 

Up until the end of 2019 students in Queensland were able to study: Maths A, Maths B, and Maths C.

Mathematics A

Maths A covers more practical topics than Maths B and C, but it is still OP eligible. There are considerably fewer algebraic concepts in this subject, and it is suitable for students who either struggled with mathematics in Year 10, or who do not require a knowledge of abstract mathematics in the future. Maths A is designed to help students to develop an appreciation of the value of Mathematics to humanity.  Students learn how mathematical concepts may be applied to a variety of life situations including business and recreational activities.  The skills encountered are relevant to a vast array of careers (trade, technical, business etc.).  Assessments in the subject include both formative and summative written tests, assignments and practical work.  It is assessed in the categories:  Knowledge & Procedures (KAPS); Modelling & Problem Solving (MAPS); Communication & Justification (CAJ).  Although Maths A is not a pre-requisite subject, but it is sufficient for entrance to many tertiary courses.

The course is divided into four semesters.  The skills learned in each semester are as follows:

Semester 1 (Year 11/Form 5):

 Data Analysis
 Managing Money
 Applied Geometry
 Linking 2 and 3 Dimensions

Semester 2 (Year 11/Form 5):

 Land Measurement
 Applied Geometry
 Statistics
 Managing Money

Semester 3 (Year 12/Form 6):

 Managing Money
 Land Measurement
 Data Analysis
 Operations Research

Semester 4 (Year 12/Form 6):

 Statistics
 Land Measurement
 Navigation
 and an elective topic on Data

Mathematics B

Maths B is considerably more theoretical than Maths A, requiring advanced algebra skills to successfully complete. It is a common prerequisite for science and engineering courses at Queensland Universities.  Maths B (in some schools) can be studied at the same time with either Maths A or Maths C, but not both.  Maths B gives students an understanding of the methods and principles of mathematics and the ability to apply them in everyday situations and in purely mathematical contexts; the capacity to model actual situations and deduce properties from the model; an interest and ability in framing and testing mathematical hypotheses; the ability to express and communicate any results obtained; some knowledge of the history of mathematics; encouragement to think independently and creatively.  Assessments are similar as those of Maths A, which includes both formative (Semester 1) and summative (Semesters 2,3 and 4) written tests, assignments and post-assignment tests.  It is also assessed in the three categories Knowledge & Procedures (KAP); Modelling & Problem Solving (MAP); Communication & Justification (CAJ).  Maths B is a pre-requisite for any tertiary course which deals with or uses math and/or science. According to the Queensland Studies Authority, in 2010, 93% of students who studied Maths B were OP eligible.

The course is divided into four (4) semesters.  The skills learned each semester are as follows:

Semester 1 (Year 11/Form 5):

 Functions (Linear, Quadratic, Absolute Value)
 Periodic Functions (Trigonometry, Sin/Cosine Functions)
 Applied Statistics (Mean, Median, Mode, Lie Factor)
 Applied Statistics 2 (Linear/Quadratic Regression, Residual Plots)

Semester 2 (Year 11/Form 5):

 Exploring Data / Statistics
 Indices and Logarithms/ Exponential Functions
 Limits and Differential Calculus 1

Semester 3 (Year 12/Form 6):

 Exponential and Log Functions
 Optimization Using Derivatives
 Integration
 Integral Calculus

Semester 4 (Year 12/Form 6):

 Applied Statistical Analysis
 Integration
 Differential Calculus 2
 Optimisation (Other Methods)

Mathematics C

Maths C extends the topics taught in Maths B, and covers additional pure-maths topics (including complex numbers, matrices, vectors, further calculus and number theory). Although not necessarily more difficult, it must be studied in conjunction with Maths B.  Maths C gives the students an understanding of the methods and principles of mathematics and the ability to apply them in everyday situations and in purely mathematical contexts; the capacity to model actual situations and deduce properties from the model; an interest and ability in framing and testing mathematical hypotheses; the ability to express and communicate any results obtained; some knowledge of the history of mathematics; encouragement to think independently and creatively.  Assessments are in the same as the other two courses, formative and summative written tests, assignments and practical work.  The student is assessed in the areas of Knowledge & Procedures (KAPS); Modelling & Problem Solving (MAPS); Communication & Justification (CAJ).  Maths C can be a pre-requisite to tertiary courses with a heavy maths/science basis.  Some skills learned in Maths C would be found in business and economics degrees.

The course is divided into four (4) semesters.  The areas learned are in the following:

Semester 1 (Year 11/Form 5):

 Real and Complex Numbers
 Matrices
 Vectors
 Groups
 Structures & Patterns

Semester 2 (Year 11/Form 5):

 Applications of Matrices
 Vectors
 Real and Complex Numbers
 Dynamics
 Structures and Patterns

Semester 3 (Year 12/Form 6):

 Structures and Patterns
 Real and Complex Numbers
 Matrices
 Periodic Functions
 Calculus
 Option I & II

Semester 4 (Year 12/Form 6):

 Vectors
 Calculus
 Dynamics
 Vectors
 Option I & II

Western Australia

New WACE mathematics courses were introduced for Year 11 students in 2015 to replace previous mathematics courses and being the Western Australian course in line with the Australian Curriculum.

The new WACE mathematics courses consist of four units.  Each unit is studied over one semester.  Therefore, Unit 1 & 2 is studied in Year 11, and Unit 3 & 4 is studied in Year 12.

The new WACE mathematics courses are:
 Mathematics Preliminary General
 Mathematics Foundation General
 Mathematics Essential General
 Mathematics Applications ATAR
 Mathematics Methods ATAR
 Mathematics Specialist ATAR

ATAR mathematics courses are for university-bound students, whereas general courses are for non-ATAR students. 

Syllabus information is available from the School Curriculum and Standards Authority (SCSA) website.

South Australia

In South Australia the mathematics courses are split into six levels:
 Numeracy for Work and Community Life (up to and including Stage 1)
 Essential Mathematics/Mathematical Pathways
 General Mathematics/Mathematical Applications
 Mathematical Methods/Mathematical Studies
 Specialist Mathematics — more advanced topics that complement and are taken concurrently with Mathematical Studies

Tertiary

References

Australia
Education in Australia by subject
Science and technology in Australia